The 1889 Govan by-election was a parliamentary by-election held on 18 January 1889 for the British House of Commons, constituency of Govan in Lanarkshire, Scotland.

The seat had become vacant when the Conservative Party Member of Parliament (MP) Sir William Pearce had died aged 55 on 18 December 1888. A major shipbuilder and owner of the Fairfield Shipbuilding and Engineering Company, Pearce had held the seat since its creation for the 1885 general election.

Candidates 
The Conservatives did not field a candidate, and the seat was contested only by the Liberal Party candidate, John Wilson, and by John Pender of the Liberal Unionists. Pender had previously been a Liberal MP for Totnes in Devon and then for Wick Burghs.

Results 
The result was a victory for Wilson, who held the seat until he stepped down at the 1900 general election.  Pender returned to Parliament three years later, when he regained his Wick Burghs seat at the 1892 general election.

Votes

See also
 Govan constituency
 1973 Glasgow Govan by-election
 1988 Glasgow Govan by-election
 Lists of United Kingdom by-elections

References 

 

1889 elections in the United Kingdom
Govan
1889 in Scotland
1880s elections in Scotland
By-elections to the Parliament of the United Kingdom in Glasgow constituencies
1880s in Glasgow